The Trinidad and Tobago men's national volleyball team represents Trinidad and Tobago in international volleyball competitions and friendly matches.

Results

Pan-American Cup
2006 — 6th place
2007 — 6th place
2008 — 6th place
2012 — 8th place

NORCECA Championship
1985 — 9th place
2007 — 8th place
2011 — 6th place

Squad 2008
Head Coach: Augusto Sabbatini

See also
Trinidad and Tobago women's national volleyball team

References
 Sports123
 NORCECA Rankings 1969-1999

Volleyball
Trinidad and Tobago
Men's sport in Trinidad and Tobago
Volleyball in Trinidad and Tobago